Gling-Gló is the only studio album by Björk Guðmundsdóttir & tríó Guðmundar Ingólfssonar, consisting of Björk Guðmundsdóttir on vocals, Guðmundur Ingólfsson on piano, Guðmundur Steingrímsson on drums, and Þórður Högnason on bass. The album's title "Gling-gló" is the Icelandic equivalent of the English onomatopoeia "ding dong", referring to the sound that a bell makes.

Most of the songs were recorded on 1 September and 3 September 1990 at Stúdio Sýrland, except for two tracks, which were recorded on 23 August 1990. It was produced by Tómas Magnús Tómasson, the bassist of Stuðmenn. The album was released in October 1990 by Smekkleysa. It received mixed reviews by critics.

Background and recording
Most of the songs were recorded on 1 September and 3 September 1990 at Stúdio Sýrland. "Ruby Baby" and "I Can't Help Loving that Man" were recorded on 23 August 1990 on Ríkisútvarpið (National Icelandic Broadcasting Service) for Djasskaffi, a radio programme hosted by Ólafur Þórðarsson. It was produced by Tómas Magnús Tómasson, the bassist of Stuðmenn.

Composition
Most of the songs are sung in Icelandic. Several of these songs are covers of jazz standards translated and sung in Icelandic. Three are sung with a noticeably different musical arrangement: "Bílavísur" (originally "The Blacksmith Blues"), "Ég veit ei hvað skal segja" (Theresa Brewer's "Ricochet Romance") and "Pabbi minn" ("O Mein Papa").

"Þad sést ekki sætari mey" is misattributed in the liner notes as a "Rodgers & Hammerstein" composition, but is instead an interpolation of Irving Berlin's "You Can't Get a Man with a Gun" from the musical Annie Get Your Gun.

Track listing

Personnel
 Björk Guðmundsdóttir – vocals, harmonica
 Guðmundur Ingólfsson – piano, tambourine
 Þórður Högnason – bass
 Guðmundur Steingrímsson – drums, maracas, Christmas bells
 Tómas Magnús Tómasson – production, mixing
 Georg Magnússon – technician 
 Óskar Jónasson – photography, cover

Credits adapted from the liner notes of Gling-Gló.

Year-end charts

Certifications and sales

Notes

References

External links
Björk official website
Lyrics to  Gling-Gló album songs
Page of album producer Tómas Magnús Tómasson (in Icelandic)

1990 debut albums
Björk albums
Jazz albums by Icelandic artists
Vocal jazz albums
Icelandic-language albums
One Little Independent Records albums